The Hama Massacre, or Hama Uprising, occurred in February 1982 when the Syrian Arab Army and the Defense Companies, under orders of the country's president Hafez al-Assad, besieged the town of Hama for 27 days in order to quell an uprising by the Muslim Brotherhood against al-Assad's government. The massacre, carried out by the Syrian Army under commanding General Rifaat al-Assad, effectively ended the campaign begun in 1976 by Sunni Muslim groups, including the Muslim Brotherhood, against the government.

Initial diplomatic reports from Western countries stated that 1,000 were killed. Subsequent estimates vary, with the lower estimates claiming that at least 2,000 Syrian citizens were killed, while others put the number at 20,000 (Robert Fisk) or 40,000 (Syrian Human Rights Committee). About 1,000 Syrian soldiers were killed during the operation, and large parts of the old city were destroyed. The attack has been described as one of the "deadliest acts by any Arab government against its own people in the modern Middle East". According to the Syrian opposition, the vast majority of the victims were civilians.

Background

The Ba'ath Party of Syria, which advocated the ideologies of Arab nationalism and Arab socialism had clashed with the Muslim Brotherhood, a group with a Sunni Islamist ideology, since 1940. The two groups were opposed in important ways. The Ba'ath party was nominally secular, nationalist. The Muslim Brotherhood, like other Islamist groups, saw nationalism as un-Islamic and religion as inseparable from politics and government. Most Ba'ath party members were from humble, obscure backgrounds and favored radical economic policies, while Sunni Muslims had dominated the souqs and landed power of Syria, and tended to view government intervention in the economy as threatening. Not all Sunni notables believed in fundamentalism, but even those who did not often saw the Brotherhood as a useful tool against the Ba'ath.

The town of Hama in particular was a "stronghold of landed conservatism and of the Muslim Brothers," and "had long been a redoubtable opponent of the Ba'athist state." The first full-scale clash between the two occurred shortly after the 1963 coup, in which the Ba'ath party first gained power in Syria. In April 1964 riots broke out in Hama, where Muslim insurgents put up "roadblocks, stockpiled food and weapons, ransacked wine shops." After an Ismaili Ba'ath militiaman was killed, riots intensified and rebels attacked "every vestige" of the Ba'ath party in Hama. Tanks were brought in to crush the rebellion and 70 members of the Muslim Brotherhood died, with many others wounded or captured, and still more disappearing underground.

After the clashes in Hama, the situation periodically erupted into clashes between the government and various Islamic sections. However, a more serious challenge occurred after the Syrian invasion of Lebanon in 1976. In October 1980, Muhammad al-Bayanuni, a respected member of the religious hierarchy of Aleppo, became the Islamic Front's Secretary-General, but its leading light remained 'Adnan Sa'd al-Din, the General Supervisor of the Muslim Brothers. The chief ideologue of the Islamic Front was a prominent religious scholar from Hama, Sa'id Hawwa, who along with Sa'd al-Din had been a leader of the northern militants during the mid-1970s. Anti-regime activists such as Marwan Hadid and Muhammad al-Hamid were also carefully listened to.

From 1976 to 1982, Sunni Islamists fought the Ba'ath Party-controlled government of Syria in what has been called a "long campaign of terror". In 1979 the Brotherhood undertook guerrilla activities in multiple cities within the country targeting military officers and government officials. The resulting government repression included abusive tactics, torture, mass arrests, and a number of selective assassinations, particularly of prominent mosque preachers. In July 1980, the ratification of Law No. 49 made membership in the Muslim Brotherhood a capital offense.

Throughout the first years of the 1980s, the Muslim Brotherhood and various other Islamist factions staged hit-and-run and bomb attacks against the government and its officials, including a nearly successful attempt to assassinate President Hafez al-Assad on 26 June 1980, during an official state reception for the president of Mali. When a machine-gun salvo missed him, al-Assad allegedly ran to kick a hand grenade aside, and his bodyguard (who survived and was later promoted to a much higher position) smothered the explosion of another one. Surviving with only light injuries, al-Assad's revenge was swift and merciless: only hours later a large number of imprisoned Islamists (reports say from 600 to 1000 prisoners) were executed in their cells in Tadmor Prison (near Palmyra), by units loyal to the President's brother Rifaat al-Assad.

In an earlier massacre in 1981, over 300 residents of Hama were killed by security forces, in a revenge attack for an Islamist terror incident.

Attack by insurgents in Hama
The events of the Hama massacre began at 2 am on 2 February 1982. An army unit searching the old city "stumbled on the hideout of the local guerilla commander, Omar Jawwad (aka Abu Bakr) and were ambushed. Other insurgent cells were alerted by radio and "roof-top snipers killed perhaps a score" of Syrian soldiers. Reinforcements were rushed to besiege Abu Bakr who then "gave the order for a general uprising" in Hama. Mosque loudspeakers used for the call to prayer called for jihad against the Ba'ath, and hundreds of Islamic insurgents rose to attack the homes of government officials and Baath Party leaders, overrun police posts and ransack armouries. By daybreak of the morning of 2 February, some 70 leading Ba'athists had been killed and the Islamist insurgents and other opposition activists proclaimed Hama a "liberated city", urging Syrians to rise up against the "infidel".

Counter-attack by government forces

According to author Patrick Seale, "every party worker, every paratrooper sent to Hama knew that this time Islamic militancy had to be torn out of the city, whatever the cost." The military was mobilized, and president Hafez al-Assad sent Rifaat's special forces (the Defense companies), elite army units and Mukhabarat agents to the city. Before the attack, the Syrian government called for the city's surrender and warned that anyone remaining in the city would be considered a rebel. Hama was besieged by 12,000 troops for three weeks – the first week spent "in regaining control of the town," and the last two "in hunting down the insurgents." Robert Fisk, a journalist who was in Hama midway through the battle, described civilians fleeing pervasive destruction.

According to Amnesty International, the Syrian military bombed the old city center from the air to facilitate the entry of infantry and tanks through the narrow streets; buildings were demolished by tanks during the first four days of fighting. Large parts of the old city were destroyed. There were also unsubstantiated reports of use of hydrogen cyanide by the government forces.

Rifaat's forces ringed the city with artillery, shelled it, then combed the rubble for surviving Muslim Brotherhood members and supporters. Suspecting that rebels were still hiding in tunnels under the old city, he had diesel fuel pumped into them and stationed tanks at their entrances to shell fleeing militants.

Fatality estimates
Initial diplomatic reports from western governments in 1982 had stated that 1,000 were killed in the fighting. Subsequent estimates of casualties varied from 2,000 to 40,000 people killed, including about 1,000 soldiers. Robert Fisk, who was in Hama shortly after the massacre, originally estimated fatalities at 10,000, but has since doubled the estimate to 20,000. Syrian general and brother to the president Rifaat al-Assad reportedly boasted of killing 38,000 people. Amnesty International initially estimated the death toll was between 10,000 and 25,000.

Reports by Syrian Human Rights Committee claimed "over 25,000" or between 30,000 and 40,000 people were killed. 
Twenty years later, Syrian journalist Subhi Hadidi, wrote that forces "under the command of General Ali Haydar, besieged the city for 27 days, bombarding it with heavy artillery and tank [fire], before invading it and killing 30,000 or 40,000 of the city's citizens – in addition to the 15,000 missing who have not been found to this day, and the 100,000 expelled."

Aftermath
After the Hama uprising, the Islamist insurrection was broken, and the Brotherhood has since operated in exile while other factions surrendered or slipped into hiding. Government attitudes in Syria hardened considerably during the uprising, and Assad would rely more on repression than on political tactics for the remainder of his rule, although an economic liberalization began in the 1990s.

After the massacre, the already evident disarray in the insurgents' ranks increased, and the rebel factions experienced acrimonious internal splits. Particularly damaging to their cause was the deterrent effect of the massacre, as well as the realization that no Sunni uprisings had occurred in the rest of the country in support of the Hama rebels. Most members of the rebel groups fled the country or remained in exile, mainly in Iran, while others would make their way to the United States, the United Kingdom and Germany. The Muslim Brotherhood—the largest opposition group—split into two factions, after giving up on armed struggle. One, more moderate and recognized by the international Muslim Brotherhood, eventually headquartered itself in the UK where it remains, while another for several years retained a military structure in Iran, with backing from the government, before rejoining the London-based mainstream.

The Hama massacre is often raised in indictment of the al-Assad government's poor human rights record. Within Syria, mention of the massacre has been strictly suppressed, although the general contours of the events—and various partisan versions, on all sides—are well known throughout the country. When the massacre is publicly referenced, it is only as the "events" or "incident" at Hama.
In 2012, Gregory Stanton from Genocide Watch characterized the Hama massacre as 'genocidal massacre', and that its effectiveness could promote future mass killings during the Syrian Civil War (which was just beginning at the time).

See also
 2004 al-Qamishli riots
 Counter-insurgency
 History of Syria, Baath Party rule under Hafez al-Assad
 List of massacres in Syria
 List of modern conflicts in the Middle East
 Siege of Hama (2011)
 Siege of Homs

References

Bibliography
Benkorich, Nora; 16 Feb. 2012, Trente ans après, retour sur la tragédie de Hama
Benjamin, Daniel; Steven Simon. 2002. The Age of Sacred Terror. Random House.

Global Politician.com. 2006 May 23. The Syrian Muslim Brotherhood.

Human Rights Watch. 2010 July 16. A wasted decade. V. Legacy of enforced disappearances. Report on human rights in Syria.

Syrian Human Rights Committee. 2006 Massacre of Hama (February 1982) Genocide and a crime against Humanity.
Syrian Human Rights Committee. 2005 (Arabic) The Massacre of Hama: Law Enforcement Requires Accountability.
United States of America. Department of State, Bureau of Public Affairs. Background note: Syria.

Further reading
 Kathrin Nina Wiedl: The Hama Massacre – reasons, supporters of the rebellion, consequences. München 2007, .

More Detailed Account of the actual Hama Massacre and Killings

Islamist uprising in Syria
Conflicts in 1982
1982 in Syria
History of Hama
Massacres in 1982
Massacres in Syria
Political repression in Syria
February 1982 events in Asia
Massacres committed by Syria
Genocidal massacres
Genocides in Asia